Carlos Parra (born 1968), known professionally as París Galán, is a Bolivian drag queen.

Carlos Parra may also refer to:
Carlos Parra (soccer, born 1977), American soccer defender
Carlos Parra (footballer, born 1992), Mexican football forward
Carlos Parra (footballer, born 1996), Spanish football rightback

See also
Charlie Parra del Riego (born 1985), Peruvian guitarist